Linda Denise Blair (born January 22, 1959) is an American actress and activist. She played Regan MacNeil in the horror film The Exorcist (1973), for which she won a Golden Globe Award and received a nomination for an Academy Award. The film established her as a horror icon and scream queen; she reprised the role in the sequel Exorcist II: The Heretic (1977), for which she earned a nomination for a Saturn Award.

Blair went on to star in numerous television films, including Born Innocent (1974), Sarah T. – Portrait of a Teenage Alcoholic (1975), and Stranger in Our House (1978), before establishing herself as a sex symbol in the musical film Roller Boogie (1979). The 1980s had her starring in numerous horror and exploitation films, including the slasher Hell Night (1981), the prison drama Chained Heat (1983), and the grindhouse cult thriller Savage Streets (1984). She was the host of the Fox Family reality series Scariest Places on Earth (2000–2006) and had regular appearances on the Animal Planet series Pit Boss (2010–2012).

Blair is a prominent activist for the animal rights movement. In 2004, she founded the Linda Blair WorldHeart Foundation, a nonprofit organization that serves to rehabilitate and adopt rescue animals. A vegan, she co-authored the book Going Vegan! in 2001.

Early life
Blair was born January 22, 1959, in St. Louis, Missouri, to James Frederick and Elinore ( Leitch) Blair. She has an older sister, Debbie, and an older brother, Jim. When Blair was two years old, her father, a Navy test pilot-turned-executive recruiter, took a job in New York City, and the family relocated to Westport, Connecticut. Her mother worked as a real-estate agent in Westport. Linda worked as a child model at age five, appearing in Sears, J.C. Penney, and Macy's catalogues, and in over 70 commercials for Welch's grape jams and various other companies. Blair secured a contract at age six for a series of print ads in The New York Times. At the same age she began riding horses, later becoming a trained equestrian.

Career

Blair started acting with a regular role on the short-lived Hidden Faces (1968–69) daytime soap opera. Her first theatrical film appearance was in The Way We Live Now (1970), followed by a bit part in the comedy The Sporting Club (1971). In 1972, Blair was selected from a field of 600 applicants for her most notable role as Regan, the possessed daughter of a famous actress, in William Friedkin's The Exorcist (1973). The role earned her a Golden Globe for Best Supporting Actress, and an Academy Award nomination for Best Supporting Actress. Film critic and historian Mark Clark notes that in her performance, "Blair matches [adult co-star] Ellen Burstyn note-for-note." Despite the film's critical successes, Blair received media scrutiny for her role in the film, which was deemed by some as "blasphemous", and Blair has said the film had significant impact on her life and career. After the film's premiere in December 1973, some reporters speculated about Blair's mental state, suggesting the filming process had resulted in her having a mental breakdown, which Blair denied, and she later received anonymous death threats. To combat the rumors and media speculation surrounding her, Warner Bros. sent the then-14-year-old Blair on an international press tour in hopes of demonstrating that she was "just a normal teenager".

Blair starred opposite Kim Hunter in the wildly controversial television film Born Innocent (1974), in which she plays a runaway teenager who is sexually abused. The film was criticized by the National Organization for Women, the New York Rape Coalition, and numerous gay and lesbian rights organizations for its depiction of female-on-female sexual abuse; the Lesbian Feminist Liberation dismissed the film, stating: "Men rape, women don't," and regarded the film as "propaganda against lesbians." After filming Born Innocent, Blair also had a supporting part as a teenaged kidney-transplant patient in the disaster film Airport 1975 (1974), which was critically panned, but a success at the box office. A steady series of job offers led Blair to relocate to Los Angeles in 1975, where she lived with her older sister, Debbie. Between 1975 and 1978, she had lead roles in numerous television films: Sarah T. – Portrait of a Teenage Alcoholic (1975), as a teenager who becomes addicted to alcohol; Sweet Hostage (1975) opposite Martin Sheen, in which she plays a kidnapping victim; and Victory at Entebbe (1976), a dramatization of a real-life hostage situation starring Anthony Hopkins and Elizabeth Taylor.

In 1977, Blair reprised her role as Regan in the Exorcist sequel, Exorcist II: The Heretic (1977), garnering a Saturn Award nomination for Best Actress of 1978. The film was a critical and commercial failure, however, and at the time was the most expensive film ever made by Warner Bros. Studios. After filming Exorcist II: The Heretic, Blair took a year off from acting and competed in national equestrian circuits under the pseudonym Martha McDonald. In 1978, she made a return to acting in the Wes Craven-directed television horror film Stranger in Our House (retitled Summer of Fear), based on the novel by Lois Duncan, and also with the lead role in the Canadian production Wild Horse Hank, in which she used her equestrian skills to play a college student saving wild horses from ranchers.

Blair's career took a new turn in 1979 with her starring role in the musical drama Roller Boogie, which established her as a sex symbol. The following year, she co-starred with Dirk Benedict in Ruckus, playing a young woman who helps a maligned Vietnam veteran evade antagonistic locals in a small town. She also starred in a number of financially successful low-budget horror and exploitation films throughout much of the 1980s. She starred opposite Peter Barton and Vincent Van Patten in the slasher film Hell Night (1981), followed by roles in the women-in-prison film Chained Heat (1983), playing a teenager in a women's prison, and the exploitation thriller Savage Streets (1984), in which she plays the lead of a female vigilante street gang who targets male rapists. In a review of Savage Streets published by TV Guide, her performance was deemed "her best since The Exorcist (1973)... and that's not saying much." Also in 1983, Blair posed nude in an issue of Playboy. In 1985, Blair starred again in another women-in-prison feature titled Red Heat, playing a prisoner of war in West Germany. This was followed by a lead in the direct-to-video film Night Force (1985), in which Blair portrayed a woman who travels to Mexico to save her friend from terrorists.

The era of Blair's career between 1980 and 1985 was marked by some critical backlash, with Blair earning a total of five Razzie Award nominations and being awarded two Razzies for Worst Actress. In the late 1980s, she worked in numerous low-budget horror films, including Grotesque (1988), opposite Tab Hunter, and the Italian production Witchery (1988), opposite David Hasselhoff. The following year, she starred in the romantic comedy Up Your Alley opposite Murray Langston, and the Exorcist spoof Repossessed in 1990, co-starring Leslie Nielsen. She also appeared in several Australian B-movies in the early 1990s, including Fatal Bond (1991) and Dead Sleep (1992).

In 1997, Blair reunited with director Wes Craven for a cameo role as a reporter in Scream (1996), and also starred in a Broadway revival of Grease, playing Rizzo. Also in 1997, she appeared in a documentary for Channel 4 in the United Kingdom entitled Didn't You Used to be Satan?, which served as a biography of her life to that point and how the film The Exorcist had dominated her career and life. Blair appeared in critic Mark Kermode's 1998 BBC documentary The Fear of God (which Kermode directed and hosted), included as a special feature on the DVD of The Exorcist.  In 1999, Blair appeared in an online parody of The Blair Witch Project titled The Blair Bitch Project.

In 2000, she was cast as a regular in the BBC television show, L.A. 7, and between 2001 and 2003, hosted Fox Family's Scariest Places on Earth, a reality series profiling reportedly haunted locations throughout the world.  Blair devotes time to a nonprofit organization she established in 2004, the Linda Blair WorldHeart Foundation, which works to rescue and rehabilitate abused, neglected, and mistreated animals and provide them with needed pet care. As an adult, she became an animal rights activist and humanitarian, working with People for the Ethical Treatment of Animals, Feed the Children, Variety, the Children's Charity, and other organizations, as well as advocating for teen HIV/AIDS awareness. Blair is on the Sea Shepherd Conservation Society operation’s board of advisors. In August 2005, the aftermath of Hurricane Katrina, Blair travelled to Mississippi and saved 51 abandoned dogs.  

In 2006, she guest-starred on The CW television series Supernatural playing the part of Detective Diana Ballard, as she aids Sam and Dean Winchester in the episode "The Usual Suspects", which aired November 9, 2006. In 2008, she appeared at the 18th annual Malaga Fantasy and Horror Film Festival to accept a lifetime achievement award for her work in the horror genre. Blair appeared the following year in the documentary Confessions of a Teenage Vigilante, discussing her role as Brenda in Savage Streets (1984). The documentary was included as a bonus feature on the 2009 DVD release of the film.

In 2010, she appeared as herself on the cable series Pit Boss and Jury Duty. She appeared in the 2011 Rick Springfield documentary Affair of the Heart, and was a panelist in a 2011 episode of The Joy Behar Show. In late 2011, Blair appeared at the taped Governors Awards for the 84th Academy Awards ceremony, honoring makeup artist Dick Smith, who had created the iconic makeup for Blair in The Exorcist. In 2013, Blair accepted a role in the comedy web series Whoa!, and has since appeared in the 2016 feature The Green Fairy, and the films Surge of Power: Revenge of the Sequel (2016) and the upcoming Landfill (post-production).

In 2022, Blair competed in season eight of The Masked Singer as "Scarecrow" which resembled the pumpkin-headed scarecrow. Before the first elimination on "Fright Night" can be announced, she interrupted Nick Cannon by declaring forfeit while claiming that her fellow contestants "Sir Bug a Boo" (who would be unmasked in the same episode to be Ray Parker Jr.) and "Snowstorm" (later unmasked in the following episode as Nikki Glaser) should face off. When unmasked, Blair did her praise for this show and stated that she wanted to talk about her animal charity called the Linda Blair WorldHeart Foundation Rescue and Wellness Center in light of the nation's animal crisis and to also annoy Ken Jeong as she claims that he annoys everyone on this show.

Personal life
At age 15, Blair dated Australian singer Rick Springfield, 25 years old at the time, whom she met during a concert at the Whisky a Go Go. She also dated Deep Purple bassist Glenn Hughes, and Neil Giraldo, guitarist and future husband of Pat Benatar. Between late 1979 and mid-1981, Blair dated Styx guitarist Tommy Shaw. Blair also dated Jim Dandy Mangrum of band Black Oak Arkansas. In the early 1990s, Blair was in a relationship with actor Wings Hauser.In a 1982 interview accompanying a topless pictorial in Oui, Blair revealed that she found Rick James "very sexy". James, who was shown the piece by a member of his retinue, returned the compliment through an intermediary. They dated for two years and James wrote his hit song "Cold Blooded" about her. Speaking on their relationship in his book Glow: The Autobiography of Rick James, he says "Linda was incredible. A free spirit. A beautiful mind. A mind-blowing body. She liked getting high and getting down as much as I did. We posed topless for a photograph that showed up everywhere. We didn't care. We were doing our own thing our own way. It was a love affair that I hoped would last. It didn't." James revealed that he found out Blair had been pregnant by him and had an abortion without his knowledge.

On December 20, 1977, at 18 years old, she was arrested for drug possession and conspiracy to sell drugs. She pleaded guilty to a reduced charge of conspiracy to possess cocaine, in exchange for three years' probation. She was also required to make at least 12 major public appearances to tell young people about the dangers of drug abuse.

Blair believes in the paranormal and supports animal welfare. In 2004, she founded the Linda Blair WorldHeart Foundation, a nonprofit organization that serves to rehabilitate and adopt rescue animals. She was a vegetarian for 13 years before becoming a vegan in 2001. Blair co-authored the book Going Vegan! in 2001.

In 2014, Blair revealed that she was treated for an umbilical hernia. , Blair resides in Coto de Caza, California.

Filmography

Film

Television

Awards and nominations

See also
List of animal rights advocates

References

Works cited

External links

Linda Blair World Heart Foundation

1959 births
20th-century American actresses
21st-century American actresses
Activists from Connecticut
Actresses from Connecticut
Actresses from St. Louis
American child actresses
American child models
American female equestrians
American film actresses
American television actresses
Best Supporting Actress Golden Globe (film) winners
Keepers of animal sanctuaries
Living people
People from Westport, Connecticut